South Pasadena is a city in southern Pinellas County, Florida, United States, near St. Pete Beach. The population was 4,964 at the 2010 census.

Geography

South Pasadena is located at  (27.754393, –82.739871).

According to the United States Census Bureau, the city has a total area of 1.1 square miles (3.0 km), of which 0.7 square mile (1.8 km) is land and 0.5 square mile (1.2 km) (40.87%) is water.

Demographics

At the 2000 census there were 5,778 people in 3,660 households, including 1,423 families, in the city. The racial makeup of the city was 98.37% White, 0.21% African American, 0.03% Native American, 0.73% Asian, 0.02% Pacific Islander, 0.21% from other races, and 0.43% from two or more races. Hispanic or Latino of any race were 1.54%.

Of the 3,660 households 2.7% had children under the age of 18 living with them, 34.2% were married couples living together, 3.9% had a female householder with no husband present, and 61.1% were non-families. Of all households 56.6% were one person and 42.3% were one person aged 65 or older.  The average household size was 1.50 and the average family size was 2.16.

The age distribution was 2.9% under the age of 18, 1.5% from 18 to 24, 9.7% from 25 to 44, 22.8% from 45 to 64, and 63.1% 65 or older.  The median age was 71 years. For every 100 females, there were 63.9 males.  For every 100 females age 18 and over, there were 62.6 males.

The median household income was $28,160 and the median family income  was $39,646. Males had a median income of $27,092 versus $26,125 for females. The per capita income for the city was $26,420.  About 6.4% of families and 8.6% of the population were below the poverty line, including 14.5% of those under age 18 and 7.1% of those age 65 or over.

References

External links

 

Cities in Florida
Cities in Pinellas County, Florida
Populated places on the Intracoastal Waterway in Florida
1955 establishments in Florida
Populated places established in 1955